Frida Ånnevik (born 18 June 1984 in Hamar, Norway) is a Norwegian jazz singer and the daughter of folk singer Tor Karseth.

Biography 
Ånnevik won the Grappa's debutant award in 2009, and released her debut album Synlige Hjerteslag the year after. The album was awarded 10 out of 10 on NRK P1 program Norsk på norsk. She won the Norwegian Lyricist Fund debutant award for 2010, awarded by NOPA. She was also nominated in two categories for the Spellemannprisen 2010, This years newcomer and Folk singer of the year, for this album.

In 2013 she released the album Ville Ord, and was awarded Spellemannprisen 2013 class Lyricist and was also nominated in the class Folk singer. In 2014 she was awarded Neshornet, a cultural prize award by the newspaper Klassekampen, and together with the band In The Country released the album Skogens Sang in 2014. The album was nominated for Spellemannprisen 2014 in the open class.

Honors 
2008: Telenor talent award, Kristiansand
2009: Grappas debutant price
2010: The Norwegian Lyricist Fund debutant award, for the album Synlige Hjerteslag
2013: Spellemannprisen in the category Lyricist of the year, for the album Ville Ord
2014: Neshornet, a cultural prize award by the newspaper Klassekampen
2015: Prøysenprisen

Discography 
2010: Synlige Hjerteslag (Grappa Music)
2013: Ville Ord (Grappa Music)
2014: Skogens Sang (Grappa Music), with In the Country
2016: Her Bor (Grappa Music)
2017: Flyge Fra (Grappa Music)

References

External links 

Frida Ånnevik on SoundCloud.
The P1 Concert at NRK

21st-century Norwegian singers
Norwegian women jazz singers
Norwegian jazz singers
Grappa Music artists
Spellemannprisen winners
1984 births
Living people
21st-century Norwegian women singers